David Marius Guardino was known as a psychic. David Guardino's signature claim to fame is the well-documented séances that he held in Graceland Mansion, when he supposedly contacted the deceased Elvis Presley.

Biography of Psychic David Marius Guardino 
David Guardino rose to prominence in the world of the occult in the 1970s, billing himself as the World's Greatest Psychic and the Psychic to the Stars. His unconventional calling led him from his home in Oregon, to Las Vegas, to Tennessee.

He claimed to possess the power of telekinesis, or psychokinesis – the ability to control objects or thoughts from a distance. He said his psychic ability was a gift from God, although he described himself as an atheistic existentialist and hedonist. His clientele included business people, entertainers and politicians. Although many people benefited from his services, others didn't; he spent most of his later life running from disgruntled clients, creditors, his nine former wives, and the Internal Revenue Service. He cheated countless "clients" out of millions of dollars over his years of predatory practices.

Over the course of 35 years, David Guardino claimed to have contacted the deceased John Lennon, Marilyn Monroe, and Adolf Hitler. His interviews with celebrities (alive and dead), predictions and séances were published in the supermarket tabloids like National Examiner and The Globe (tabloid) (Tragically, in 2001, the offices of American Media Corporation in Boca Raton, Florida, were attacked with anthrax. The building and its contents – including David's writings – were destroyed. However, David's father had maintained a scrapbook of David's news clips through the years. Those scrapbook files are listed below, along with legal documents from court cases.)

Legal issues dogged him almost from the beginning. In 1979 while known professionally as “Jamil”, he sued his partners for allegedly cheating him out of his psychic business in Portland, Oregon. The Oregon Attorney General's Office got involved after eight of David's former clients complained that he had not followed through on his promises – like curing paralysis and growing hair on a bald head. David counter-sued the State of Oregon for prejudice against his psychic business.

David Guardino's flamboyant lifestyle deeply concerned and embarrassed his parents and siblings. None of them truly believed his claims of telekinesis. But his mother refused to give up on him. For more than three decades, she fought an intense spiritual warfare on David's behalf. Her efforts finally led to his return to his Christian roots just before he died, disgraced and penniless in the Federal Correctional Institution, a prison for inmates with medical issues, in Fort Worth, Texas.

The eldest of six children, David was born August 24, 1942, to Mariano J. (Monte) Guardino and Harriet Smith Guardino. He lived a middle-class life in California and Oregon, graduated from Southern Oregon University, and began a career as a social worker. He died May 10, 2007 at age 64 from complications of obesity and diabetes.

Controversy 
Controversy over David Guardino's authenticity remains an issue. David's work is cited in
 "21st Century Jedi", published in 2010 by Dr. Damon Sprock. Dr. Sprock was a customer of David's in 1980, and became
 a true believer after David got Dr. Sprock's ex-girlfriend to return. But, analysis of a list of David's yearly psychic predictions published in The Globe (tabloid) in 1981 suggest that he could have done as well by flipping a coin:
 Predictions. And, while many of his clients received the help they paid for, others felt cheated and even threatened:
 Two Clients Give Conflicting Views
 Eagle Protection Group: Scams, Fraud blows the whistle on David's illegal activities during his later years. Titled "World Famous Psychic a Fraud? Exposed", the segment begins: "If you know anything about this case please e-mail us, using the reference number below." Reference# 20019A Date: July 11, 2005.

Newspaper References

The Oregonian Portland, Oregon
Clay Eals, “Psychic adding bathtub-generated powers to Portland investment firm,” March 11, 1979, 2M, B3;
Clay Eals, “Lawsuit pending: Psychic leaves town as feud grows,” June 4, 1979;
Clay Eals, “Owner of psychic firm sues attorney general,” April 2, 1980;
Jim Hill, “Order against psychic discontinued by judge,” June 1979;
Clay Eals, “Owner of psychic firm sues attorney general,” April 2, 1980.

Oregon Observer
Richard Cone, “The strange case of Oregon vs. Guardino,” March 17, 1979.  An overview of the career of Guardino, and an in depth interview with his attorney in the Oregon Dept. of Justice fraud suit, Steven Sindell, the Chicago attorney who represented the families of the students killed at Kent State by National Guard troops—at the time, the highest settlement for wrongful death in U.S history.

Register Guard, Eugene, Oregon
Don Bishoff, “Psychic just regular guy with gift,” January 14, 1977;
“Psychic 'Jamil' files countersuit,” March 29, 1980.

Oregon Daily Emerald, Eugene, Oregon
“Psychic battles state lawsuit,” March 31, 1980.

Las Vegas Review-Journal
Mark Dent, “Oregon files lawsuit against Las Vegas 'psychic',” February 26, 1980, p. 13A;
“Attorney General Sues 'Psychic',” March 26, 1980; “Feds indict 'psychic' in credit fraud,” October 3, 1986, p. B1.

Associated Press
“Attorney General Sues 'Psychic',” March 26, 1980.

The Daily Times, Maryville, Tennessee
Barry McManus, “David Guardino: Have whammies, will travel,” January 24, 1984, p. 9.

Knoxville News-Sentinel
Jamie Satterfield, “Caryville psychic arrested – Man who faces 3 counts of income tax evasion, may be headed back to prison,” September 13, 2005;
Jamie Satterfield, Psychic found guilty of tax evasion,”  May 23, 2006;
News Sentinel staff, “Burglary and violence charges against psychic go to grand jury,”  May 10, 2006;
Jamie Satterfield,“Psychic found guilty of tax evasion,”  May 23, 2006;
Jamie Satterfield, “Tax evasion lands psychic in prison,” February 14, 2007.

National Examiner
David Guardino, “Exclusive Examiner Interview … Doug Henning to give up tricks for real magic,” November 18, 1980;
Ron Lee, “Exclusive interview: Don't sell your soul to the devil, warns top psychic,” September 8, 1981;
Hugo Slater, “Special Feature: Hitler Speaks…Top psychic David Guardino contacts Fuehrer's spirit beyond the grave,” November 4, 1980;
“Jesus Was World's Greatest Psychic,” December 15, 1981;
Eric Faucher, “Christ was space alien: Bible proves theory true, top psychic reveals,” June 22, 1982;
David Guardino, “Donny and Marie reveal: 'Elvis called us just before he died',” March 10, 1981;
Ron Lee, “Ghost of Elvis,” May 12, 1981;
Eric Faucher, “The 'King' Elvis Presley: 'The real reason for my death was a broken heart', August 17, 1982;
David Guardino, “Amazing revelation from beyond the grave … My affair with JFK – by Marilyn Monroe,” December 9, 1980;
Ron Lee, “Examiner Exclusive: John Lennon's last song, written after his murder,” April 21, 1981;
David Guardino, “Real story behind the Kennedy curse,” October 10, 1980;
“Top psychic tells about: Voodoo curse that killed John Lennon,” February 1, 1981;
David Guardino, “Reagan will be a great president – twice,” December 16, 1980;
Naomi Wade, “Séance with Abraham Lincoln: I will come back to save America,” January 6, 1981;
Ron Lee, “Famous psychic claims; Magic can bring back a lost lover,” December 19, 1981;
“The success of your marriage is influenced by date of your wedding,” October 12, 1981.

Court Records
 State of Oregon, ex rel James A. Redden, Attorney General of Oregon, Plaintiff, v. David Guardino, aka Jamil, Defendant, Judgment by Stipulation, ORCP 67F, No. 16-80-01619, February 15, 1983.
 United States of America, Plaintiff-Appellee v. David Guardino, Defendant-Appellant. United States Court of Appeals, Sixth Circuit – 972 F.2d 682, Submitted and Argued June 16, 1992, Decided August 14, 1992, before Circuit Judges Keith and Ryan, and Senior Circuit Judge Krupansky.
 United States of America, Plaintiff-Appellee, v. David Guardino, Defendant-Appellant. No. 91-6212, United States Court of Appeals, Sixth Circuit. May 22, 1992.
 United States of America, Plaintiff-Appellee, v. David Guardino, Defendant-Appellant. No. 91-6212, United States Court of Appeals, Sixth Circuit. May 22, 1992.
 Order, Case No. 94-6386, United States Court of Appeals for the Sixth Circuit, November 15, 1994, Claim: Ms. Eunice Holt James, Chief of Probation and Pretrial Services, U.S. Courts, Probation and Pretrial Services Division.
 Motion, In the United States District Court for the Eastern District of Tennessee at Greeneville, David Marius Guardino, Plaintiff, vs. Steve Cus Sr. et al., Defendants, No. 3:94-CV-108, Exhibit 18, August 22, 1994.
 USA v. Payne, Defendant Wendy L. Payne (aka Golden), U.S. District Court, Eastern District of Tennessee (Knoxville), Case # 3:00-cr-00175-1, filed November 8, 2000.
 U.S. District Court, Eastern District of Tennessee (Knoxville) Civil Docket for Case # 3:02-cv-00687, Guardino v. USA, et al., Assigned to: District Judge Thomas W. Phillips, 12/5/2002.
 Order No. 03-5089, U.S. Court of Appeals for the Sixth Circuit, David M. Guardino, Petitioner-Appellant, v. United States of America; Department of the Treasury; Internal Revenue Service; Special agent Bruce McMillan, Respondents-Appellees, March 21, 2005.
 Motion to Expedite Briefing and Submission, United States of America Plaintiff/Appellee v. David Marius Guardino Defendant/Appellant, U.S. Court of Appeals for the Sixth Circuit, Case No. 07-5246, March 28, 2007.

References

External links
  "Elvis Was One of My Failures"
 Tax Update Blog: Permalink, “Clairvoyant convicted. We see his future,” May 23, 2006.
 Tax Update Blog, "Strangest attempt to influence a sentencing judge?” February 14, 2007.

1942 births
2007 deaths
American psychics